Ischnocampa birchelli is a moth of the family Erebidae. It was described by Herbert Druce in 1901. It is found in Colombia.

References

 

Ischnocampa
Moths described in 1901